This list of Mario television episodes covers three television series based upon Nintendo's Mario series of video games. The three series were produced by DIC Entertainment: The Super Mario Bros. Super Show! (1989) is based upon Super Mario Bros. and Super Mario Bros. 2; The Adventures of Super Mario Bros. 3 (1990) is based upon Super Mario Bros. 3; and Super Mario World (1991) is loosely based upon Super Mario World. All except Club Mario focus on the characters of Mario and Luigi assisting Princess Toadstool in thwarting the plots and schemes of King Koopa.

Each series episodes is listed in order of airdate. The names "Princess Toadstool" and "King Koopa" are primarily used prior to the release of Super Mario 64, which define them as "Princess Peach" and "Bowser" respectively. The Koopalings are defined with different names and personalities in The Adventures of Super Mario Bros. 3 before the American names were decided by Nintendo, and retain these for Super Mario World. By 1991, all three Super Mario animated series had broadcast a combined total of 91 episodes.

Series overview

The Super Mario Bros. Super Show!
All episodes are listed in production order and airdate. The episodes would re-air in 1990 under Club Mario with the live-action segments replaced with newer five-minute sequences replacing the show's original live-action segments.

The Legend of Zelda

The Adventures of Super Mario Bros. 3
The following lists the animated episodes of The Adventures of Super Mario Bros. 3, in order of their original airdate.

Super Mario World
The following lists the animated episodes of Super Mario World, in order of their original airdate.

See also

 The Legend of Zelda (TV series)
 The Power Team (TV series)
 Captain N: The Game Master

Notes

References

 
Mario
Mario